Paul "Andy" Mason was an American football player and coach, as well as a collegiate basketball coach. He was a 1915 graduate of Purdue University and lettered in 1914 and 1915 on the school's football team. He played professionally for the Toledo Maroons of the Ohio League in 1917.

After his playing career ended, he served as the head football coach (1925–1926) and head men's basketball coach (1925–1927) at Defiance College in Defiance, Ohio.

Head coaching record

Football

References

Year of birth missing
Year of death missing
American football guards
American football tackles
Defiance Yellow Jackets football coaches
Defiance Yellow Jackets men's basketball coaches
Purdue Boilermakers football players
Toledo Maroons players